Jorge Armando Arce Armenta (born July 27, 1979), best known as Jorge Arce, is a Mexican former professional boxer who competed from 1996 to 2014. He is a multiple-time world champion, and the second boxer from Mexico to win world titles in four weight divisions (after Érik Morales, who first achieved the feat two months prior). In a storied career, Arce held the WBO light flyweight title from 1998 to 1999; the WBC and lineal light flyweight titles from 2002 to 2004; the WBO super flyweight title in 2010; the WBO junior featherweight title in 2011; and the WBO bantamweight title from 2011 to 2012. Additionally he held the WBC interim flyweight title from 2005 to 2006, the WBA interim super flyweight title from 2008 to 2009, and challenged once for the WBC featherweight title in his final fight in 2014.

Arce remains a favorite fighter among boxing fans and is also the older brother of title contender Francisco Arce Armenta. Arce's trademark ring entrance featured him wearing a black cowboy hat (earning him the nickname "The Mexican Cowboy") and sucking a cherry lollipop.

Professional career

Early years at light flyweight
Arce turned pro at the age of 16, winning his first four fights. He lost to future champion Omar Romero and drew with Gabriel Munoz in back-to-back fights in the summer of 1996, but then won 10 straight bouts and a pair of regional belts before losing on points to veteran (and future IBF Light Flyweight Champion) Jose Victor Burgos on December 12, 1997.

He recovered from that setback with four straight wins, earning his first world title shot on December 5, 1998 against Juan Domingo Córdoba for the WBO Light Flyweight title. Arce won the fight and became a world champion at the age of 19.

After making one successful defense of his title, Arce drew a big-money fight in Tijuana against three-time former champion Michael Carbajal on July 31, 1999. Arce was ahead on all three judges' scorecards after 10 rounds, but in the 11th, the veteran Carbajal connected with a stunning right hand and captured the crown via a technical knockout, as Arce was unable to continue.

After a four-month layoff, Arce returned to the ring and won a WBO regional belt as he scored 7 consecutive wins while working his way back up the rankings for another title shot. That came on October 20, 2001, when he defeated Juanito Rubillar for the Interim WBC version of the Light Flyweight title. Nine months later, he beat Yo-Sam Choi, the reigning Lineal and WBC light flyweight champion who had been out with an injury, to take full distinction. He held the title until the summer of 2005 before relinquishing it to move up in weight. In his first defense, he defeated Augustin Lara. In 2003, he successfully defended his title three times against Ernesto Castro, Lee Marvin Sandoval, and Melchor Cob Castro.

Towards the end of 2003, he participated in the Televisa version of Big Brother, the Big Brother V.I.P. show that put celebrities together. He arrived in third place, then went training for his next defense, against former world champion Joma Gamboa on January 10 of the following year. Arce invited his Big Brother celebrity friends to the fight with Gamboa, his first fight of 2004, which he won by a second-round knockout. But during and after the fight, chaos ensued. One of his friends, actress Arleth Gonzalez, was kicked off her chair by another person. And Verónica Castro was pursued by the press when she was trying to leave the fight site, taking her more than two hours to get to the site's parking lot.

On April 24, 2004, Arce successfully defended his title in a rematch against former champ Melchor Cob Castro in Tuxtla Gutiérrez, Chiapas. Arce had beaten Castro in May 2003, but the fight was called off after six rounds due to a clash of heads which injured Arce. The fight went to the scorecards and Arce won a narrow, but controversial, decision. He left no doubt in the rematch, knocking Castro out in the fifth round.

On September 4 of that same year, he retained the title with a twelve-round decision in a rematch with Rubillar. The fight caused some controversy afterwards, when Rubillar's manager accused the fight's judges of robbing his fighter, going on to offer Arce 100,000 US$ for a rematch, which would be held in the Philippines.

Arce moved on to defend his title for a seventh time on December 18, defeating Juan Centeno by a third-round TKO. He then decided to try his luck in the flyweight (112-pound) weight division.

Flyweight
On March 19, 2005, Arce stopped Hussein Hussein in the 10th round of a fight for the right to challenge Pongsaklek Wonjongkam for his WBC Flyweight title. He later relinquished his light flyweight crown and was matched by the WBC with Angel Priolo on July 30 for their interim title after Wonjongkam suffered an injury. Arce scored a third-round TKO win in the fight, held in La Paz, Mexico.

While waiting to fight Wongjongkam, Arce stayed busy by rematching Hussein on October 8 in Las Vegas. He retained his Interim WBC title with a second-round knockout.

On December 16, 2005, Arce defeated former two-time champion Adonis Rivas by 10th round tko. In his next bout, Arce defeated Rivas in a rematch.

On April 8, 2006, Arce took on the well regarded, former WBA Minimumweight and Light Flyweight Champion Rosendo Alvarez of Nicaragua, knocking Alvarez out in the sixth round. It was the 4th successful defense of his Interim Flyweight title.

Super flyweight
On September 23, 2006, he moved up to the super flyweight division where he defeated former Light Flyweight Champion Masibulele "Hawk" Makepula by fourth-round knockout (which, according to the HBO commentators, he had predicted earlier).  On January 27, 2007, he defeated Argentinian Julio Ler in a 12-round decision, thus earning the WBC #1 super-flyweight ranking.

On April 14, 2007, he lost a 12-round unanimous decision to WBC Super Flyweight Champion Cristian Mijares in San Antonio, Texas. Mijares won the fight by a wide margin, with the official judges scoring the match 119–109, 118–110, 117–111, all in favor of Mijares.

Arce rebounded from the loss by defeating future champion Tomás Rojas by 6th-round technical knockout. On December 1, 2007, Arce defeated former Flyweight Champion Medgoen Singsurat by technical knockout in the first round.

On May 17, 2008, in a very close fight, Arce (49–4–1, 37 KOs) edged Devid Lookmahanak of Thailand (18–2, 9 KOs) with a majority decision in the main event at the Plaza Monumental Aguascalientes in Aguascalientes, Mexico. With a sold-out crowd of 18,000 fans cheering him on, Arce had to dig deep and work hard to pull past the once-beaten Lookmahanak, who turned out to be a very game southpaw and rarely took a step back. The difference in the fight, which also gave Arce the win, was a knockdown in the seventh round. The scores were 115–113, 115–114 and 114–114. Without the extra point for the knockdown, the fight would have been scored a draw. The bout was an eliminator for a shot at the WBC Super Flyweight title. Arce moves on to a rematch with Cristian Mijares, who earlier captured the WBA's version of the title with a points win over Alexander Muñoz.

On September 15, 2008, Arce won the Interim WBA Super Flyweight title from holder Rafael Concepción.

Arce blasted former champion Isidro García, on November 1, 2008, via (48 seconds of the) 4th round technical knockout for a super flyweight belt. He improved to 51–4–1, with 38 wins inside the distance, while Garcia, who has lost 3 of his last 4 fights, was down to 25–6–2.

On February 7, 2009, Arce was defeated by Undisputed Super Flyweight Champion Vic Darchinyan.

Arce fought Simphiwe Nongqayi on September 15, 2009 for the IBF Super Flyweight title which was recently vacated by Darchinyan. However, he ended losing by unanimous decision.

Arce defeated Indonesian Angky Angkota on January 30, 2010, winning the vacant WBO Super Flyweight title. Prior to the bout, Arce stated that he would retire from boxing if he would have lost.

Bantamweight
On April 24, 2010, Arce jumped to the bantamweight division to fight fellow Mexican Cecilio Santos (24–13–3; 14 KO) at the Centro de Usos Multiples in Ciudad Obregón, Sonora, Mexico. Arce defeated his opponent by KO in the 7th round, improving his record to 54–6–1. This was not his first fight as a bantamweight: he already fought once in the weight class in 2007.

Arce was scheduled to fight Eric Morel (42–2; 21 KO) of Puerto Rico on June 26, 2010 at the Alamodome in San Antonio, Texas, United States with the Interim WBO Bantamweight title at stake. The Los Mochis native withdrew from the fight a few weeks in advance due to a cut he received while in training.

In his next fight, on July 31, 2010, Arce took on fellow Mexican and former champion Martín "El Gallo" Castillo at the Palenque de la Feria in Tepic, Nayarit, Mexico. The Los Mochis native won the bout by KO in the first round.

Super bantamweight
On May 7, 2011, as a heavy underdog, he beat a then undefeated WBO Super Bantamweight Champion, Wilfredo Vazquez, Jr. of Puerto Rico by twelfth-round technical knockout. He avenged his prior loss to former champion Simphiwe Nongqayi in defense of his title.

Bantamweight
Arce moved down to the bantamweight division to face Angky Angkotta in a rematch for the vacant WBO bantamweight title. He defeated Angkotta by unanimous decision.

Return to super bantamweight
On February 18, 2012, he defeated former champion Lorenzo Parra. In his next fight, he faced future featherweight title holder Jesus Rojas. Arce dropped Rojas in the opening round, however, the fight ended in a no-contest in the 2nd round after Rojas delivered a series of fowls rendering Arce unable to continue. 

He then moved up to the featherweight division and defeated former champion Mauricio Martínez.

On December 15, 2012, Arce fought WBO Super Bantamweight champion Nonito Donaire. He suffered a defeat on the third round via knockout. After losing to Donaire, Arce announced his retirement.

Featherweight
Arce announced his return to the ring a year later in the featherweight division. After scoring three consecutive wins, he challenged WBC World Featherweight champion Jhonny Gonzalez, however, he was defeated by 11th round TKO. He retired after the bout.

Life outside of boxing
Arce has gained some popularity outside the ring as well, acting in various Televisa comedy sketches, and participating in Adal Ramones's show's dancing contest, "Bailando por un Sueño", where he and a fellow contestant arrived in eighth place out of nine couples. He has also done boxing commentary for TV Azteca.

Professional boxing record

Exhibition boxing record

See also
List of world light-flyweight boxing champions
List of world super-flyweight boxing champions
List of world bantamweight boxing champions
List of world super-bantamweight boxing champions
List of boxing quadruple champions
List of Mexican boxing world champions
Notable boxing families

References

External links 

Jorge Arce profile at Cyber Boxing Zone

1979 births
Living people
Mexican male boxers
Boxers from Sinaloa
Sportspeople from Los Mochis
World Boxing Council champions
World Boxing Organization champions
World Boxing Association champions
World light-flyweight boxing champions
World super-flyweight boxing champions
World bantamweight boxing champions
World super-bantamweight boxing champions
Flyweight boxers
Featherweight boxers